Acianthera antennata is a species of orchid native to Brazil.

Distribution 
Its range is Southern Brazil. It is an epiphyte that grows in warm to cool habitats .

Taxonomy 
It was named by Alec Melton Pridgeon and Mark Wayne Chase, in 2001.

References 

antennata
Plants described in 1953
Taxa named by Mark Wayne Chase